Corpse plant is a common name for several flowering plants and may refer to:

Amorphophallus titanum, a plant with a rancid smell
Monotropa uniflora, a wholly white plant without chlorophyll